The Room's Too Cold is the debut studio album by the American rock band The Early November. Produced by Chris Badami, it was released on October 7, 2003 through Drive-Thru Records. It was co-produced by the lead singer - Arthur 'Ace' Enders. The album also features a guest appearance from Kenny Vasoli of The Starting Line, who was also signed to Drive-Thru at the time. The album peaked at number 107 on US Billboard 200.

Recording
The Room's Too Cold was recorded at Portrait Recording Studio in Lincoln Park, New Jersey with Chris Badami and Enders producing the sessions. The former also acted as engineer, with assistance from Michelle Dispenziere; Badami mixed the tracks before the album was mastered by Alan Douches at West West Side Music in New York City. The band recorded 17 songs in total, with 11 songs making the final track listing. Enders and Badami met with David Rimelis to arrange a string part for "Ever So Sweet".

Release
Between late August and October 2003, the group performed on the Drive-Thru Records 2003 Invasion Tour. The Room's Too Cold was released on October 7. In January 2004, the band went on a tour of the UK, with Allister, Home Grown, Hidden in Plain View, and Yourcodenameis:milo. In March 2004, the group went on a headlining US tour with support from Limbeck, Spitalfield and Hey Mercedes. A music video was filmed for "Something That Produces Results" in April 2004. In April and May 2004, the band supported Less Than Jake on their tour of North America, and performed at the Skate and Surf Festival. They went on a brief East Coast tour with A Thorn for Every Heart, Engine Down and Days Away at the start of 2005. In February 2005, the group supported Sugarcult on the US Take Action Tour. In late 2013, the album was repressed on vinyl through Rise Records. In addition, the group performed it in its entirety in December of the same year.

Track listing 
All lyrics written by Arthur Enders, except one line in "Baby Blue" by Matt Pryor, all songs written by the Early November.

Notes
 "Something That Produces Results" & "Baby Blue" both have an acoustic renditions on Aces band I Can Make A Mess Like Nobody's Business acoustic album "Dust'n Off the Ol" Gee-Tar."
 The line "I don't want you to love me anymore" on the track "Baby Blue" is taken directly from a The Get Up Kids song "No Love" on their debut album Four Minute Mile.
 The singles were The Mountain Range in My Living Room and Something That Produces Results

Personnel
Personnel per booklet.

The Early November
 Arthur Enders – vocals, guitar, percussion, samples, keyboards
 Sergio Anello – bass guitar, percussion
 Jeff Kummer – drums, percussion
 Joseph Marro – guitar, Rhodes piano, keyboards, vibraphone

Additional musicians
 David Rimelis – string arrangements
 The Madison String Quartet – strings
 Evelyn Estavaof – violin
 Elizabeth Schulze – viola
 Gerall Hieser – cello
 Kenny Vasoli – additional vocals (track 10)

Production and design
 Chris Badami – producer, engineer, mixing
 Arthur Enders – producer
 Michelle Dispenziere – assistant engineer
 Alan Douches – mastering
 Asterik Studio – art direction, design
 The Early November – art direction
 Jeff Gross – photography
 Dennis Kleiman – band photography

Charts

Album

References
Citations

Sources

 
 

The Early November albums
2003 debut albums
Drive-Thru Records albums
Albums produced by Chris Badami